Eberhard Brünen (August 8, 1906 – October 30, 1980) was a German politician of the Social Democratic Party (SPD) and former member of the German Bundestag.

Life 
In 1945 Brünen rejoined the SPD, was District Administrator in Dinslaken and from 1946 to 1969 City Councillor in Duisburg, and from 1947 to 1950 and from 1954 to 1961 he was a member of the North Rhine-Westphalia Landtag. He was a member of the German Bundestag from 1949 to 1953 and again from 1961 to 1972. He was always directly elected in the constituency of Duisburg I.

Literature

References 

 
1906 births 
1980 deaths
Members of the Bundestag for North Rhine-Westphalia
Members of the Bundestag 1969–1972
Members of the Bundestag 1965–1969
Members of the Bundestag 1961–1965
Members of the Bundestag 1949–1953
Members of the Bundestag for the Social Democratic Party of Germany
Members of the Landtag of North Rhine-Westphalia